Yanamayo (possibly from Quechua yana black, mayu river, "black river") is a river in the Ancash Region in Peru. It flows along the border between the provinces Carlos Fermín Fitzcarrald and Mariscal Luzuriaga and empties into the Marañón River as a left tributary. The confluence is on the border of the districts Eleazar Guzman Barron, San Nicolás and Canchabamba.

See also 
 Huachucocha

References

Rivers of Peru
Rivers of Ancash Region